Thomas Worthington High School (TWHS) is a public school in Worthington, Ohio. The school was named Worthington High School until 1991, when sister school, Worthington Kilbourne High School, opened.

With approximately 1700 students, TWHS is the largest school in the Worthington City School District. Its mascot is the cardinal, and the school colors are red and blue. A map of the district divisions is located here.

Within the Worthington City School District, Worthingway Middle School, Kilbourne Middle School, and Phoenix Middle School students who would traditionally go to Worthingway or Kilbourne feed in to TWHS.

Clubs and activities

Clubs and organizations
TWHS offers many clubs and organizations to its students.
 In-the-Know - An academic quiz team
 Jazz Band
 Theatre
 Marching Band
 Mock Trial Team - A team that competes in the Ohio High School Mock Trial competition
 Pit Orchestra
 Science Olympiad
 Student Council
 Key Club
 Brunch Club
 FIRST Robotics - A part of the FIRST Robotics Program allowing students to explore robotics and compete on an international scale.

Athletics
The following sports are available to students:

Baseball sports
Basketball
Bowling
Cheerleading
Cross country
Field hockey
Football
Golf
Gymnastics
Ice hockey
Lacrosse
Marching band
Soccer
Softball
Swimming
Tennis
Track and field
Volleyball
Water polo
Wrestling

Ohio High School Athletic Association State Championships

 Boys baseball - 1981
 Boys golf - 1938, 1978, 1983
 Boys soccer - 1991, 1998, 2001
 Boys track - 1997, 1999, 2017 
 Boys cross country - 1967
 Boys gymnastics - 1987
 Girls cross country - 1989, 1992
 Girls field hockey - 1988, 2007, 2011, 2015, 2016, 2017, 2022 
 Girls gymnastics - 1985, 1986, 1987, 1988, 1989
 Girls swimming - 1977, 1978, 1980, 1981, 1989

Other athletic accomplishments

 State Champions - Boys water polo - 2002, 2003, 2017 (Sponsored by the Ohio High School Swim Coaches Association)
 State Champions - Boys lacrosse  - 1989,1990,1991,1996 (Sponsored by the Ohio High School Lacrosse Association)

Notable alumni
Juli Briskman, 1985, - journalist and politician
Maggie Grace, did not graduate but attended the high school - Actress
Rachael Harris, 1986 - actress
Bob Hill, 1967 - NBA coach
Jim Kammerud, 1978 - cartoonist
Molly Ludlow, 2005 - middle-distance runner
Betty Montgomery, 1966 - Ohio senator and attorney general
Christopher Paul, 1981 - Al Qaeda terrorist
Troy Perkins, 1999 - Major League Soccer player
Jack Plotnick, 1987 - actor  
Claire Shipman, 1980 - television journalist
J.K. Simmons, 1972 - actor
Jeff Smith, 1978 - cartoonist
Frank Truitt, 1943 - 2014 collegiate basketball coach at Ohio State University, Louisiana State University, and Kent State University
Dana Tyler, 1977 – Senior News Anchor for WCBS-TV

References

High schools in Franklin County, Ohio
Worthington, Ohio
Public high schools in Ohio